Circumferential Road 4 (C-4), informally known as the C-4 Road, is a network of roads and bridges that all together form the fourth beltway of Metro Manila in the Philippines.

Route description

C-4 Road

The section of C-4 Road is simply known as such from R-10 at the Bangkulasi Bridge over Tullahan River in Navotas to Paterio Aquino Avenue (Letre Road) at the boundary of Malabon and Caloocan.

Gen. San Miguel Street
After passing Paterio Aquino Avenue (Letre Road), C-4 becomes General San Miguel Street, a four-lane road in Caloocan.

Samson Road

After passing the junction with Marcelo H. Del Pilar and A. Mabini Streets in Caloocan, C-4 becomes Samson Road. Also called "Caloocan Road" and "Monumento Avenue", it is a main road in Caloocan with four lanes, running up to the roundabout at Monumento, a monument to Andrés Bonifacio.

Epifanio de los Santos Avenue

EDSA is a 10-lane highway that utilizes interchanges and grade separations. EDSA forms the majority portion of the Circumferential Road 4 (C-4) in Metro Manila, passing through the cities of Caloocan, Quezon City, San Juan, Mandaluyong, Makati, and Pasay. The C-4 segment of EDSA starts at Monumento in Caloocan and ends at the intersection with Roxas Boulevard in Pasay.

Intersections

See also
 List of roads in Metro Manila

Notes

References

Routes in Metro Manila